Neoalcis is a monotypic moth genus in the family Geometridae erected by James Halliday McDunnough in 1920. Its only species, Neoalcis californiaria, the brown-lined looper, was described by Packard in 1871.

It is found along the west coast of North America, from California to British Columbia.

The wingspan is about 34 mm.

The larvae feed on various broadleaf trees and shrubs, but mainly Douglas-fir. Other host plants include western hemlock, western red cedar, grand fir and lodgepole pine.

References
Citations

Bibliography

Boarmiini
Monotypic moth genera
Taxa named by James Halliday McDunnough